Real Life Conversations is the second album by American contemporary Christian music singer and songwriter Steven Curtis Chapman. The album was released in 1988 by Sparrow Records and produced by Phil Naish.

This second album features a harder and edgier sound that steers more toward light rock music than his previous album.

Track listing
All songs written by Steven Curtis Chapman, except where noted.
 "Faithful Too"  – 4:02
 "Tuesday's Child"  – 4:12
 "For Who He Really Is"  – 5:08
 "Consider It Done" – 3:46
 "His Eyes"  – 3:36
 "The Human Race"  – 3:43
 "Wait"  – 4:14
 "Truth or Consequences" – 5:07
 "My Turn Now"  – 3:28
 "His Strength Is Perfect"  – 4:36

Personnel 
Musicians
 Steven Curtis Chapman – lead vocals, backing vocals, guitars
 Phil Naish – keyboards, backing vocals
 Jon Goin – guitars
 Mark O'Connor – mandolin, mandola
 Mike Brignardello – bass
 Mark Hammond – drums
 Alan Moore – string arrangements (5, 7)
 Carl Gorodetzsky – string leader (5, 7)
 The Nashville String Machine – strings (5, 7)
 Geoff Moore – guest vocal (1)
 Herb Chapman – backing vocals
 Chris Rodriguez – backing vocals

Volunteer Choir on "His Strength Is Perfect"
 Dee Dee Addison
 Lisa Angelle
 Keith Boyd
 Mike Brignardello
 Bruce Carroll
 Emily Chapman
 Sherri Chapman
 Debbie Cunningham 
 Ken Cunningham
 Dennis Disney 
 Tony Elenburg
 Elizabeth Groner
 Celeste Hammond
 P. WE Herman
 Brad Jamison
 Rhonda Kissinger
 Greg Kroeker
 Suzanne Kroeker 
 Brent Lamb
 Missy McGinty
 Geoff Moore
 Becky Naish
 Michael Puryear
 Charley Redmond
 Delyn Redmond 
 Chris Rodriguez
 Lisa Rodriguez
 Jerry Salley
 Amy K. Smith
 Brian White
 Robin Wilkes
 BeBe Winans
 Sharon Ziegler

Production 
 Phil Naish – producer
 Ronnie Brookshire – recording
 Carry Summers – assistant engineer
 Bob Clark – string engineer
 Jeff Balding – mixing
 Denny Purcell – mastering
 Cindy Wilt – production manager
 Mark Tucker – photography
 5 Penguins Design – design
 Barbara Catanzaro-Hearn – art direction

Studios
 OmniSound – Nashville, Tennessee – recording studio
 Goldmine – Nashville, Tennessee – recording studio
 Downstage – Nashville, Tennessee – recording studio
 Great Circle Sound – Nashville, Tennessee – recording studio 
 Georgetown Masters, Nashville, Tennessee – mastering location

References

Steven Curtis Chapman albums
1988 albums